The 1974–75 Toronto Maple Leafs season was the 58th season of the franchise, 48th season as the Maple Leafs.

Offseason

NHL Draft

Regular season

Season standings

Schedule and results

Transactions

Player statistics

Regular season
Scoring

Goaltending

Playoffs
Scoring

Goaltending

Transactions
The Maple Leafs have been involved in the following transactions during the 1974–75 season.

Trades

Waivers

Expansion Draft

Free agents

Awards and honors

Farm Teams

References
 Maple Leafs on Hockey Database

Toronto Maple Leafs seasons
Toronto Maple Leafs season, 1974-75
Toronto